The Sangamon Valley Conference was an IHSA-sanctioned conference in northeastern Illinois established in 1948. The conference hosts primarily 1A-2A schools. It was the first Illinois conference to host an Indiana high school, as South Newton of Kentland, Indiana played from 2015 to 2018 to rejoin the Midwest Athletic Conference. Following the 2020-21 school year the conference disbanded.

Final members

 was called Crescent-Iroquois-Cissna Park as the host in a co-op with Crescent-Iroquois (based in Crescent City until Crescent City-Iroquois consolidated into Cissna Park in 2009.

Former Members

 DeLand-Weldon was known as DeLand before 1949.

References

External links
 Sangamon Valley Conference
 Illinois High School Association, Official Site

Illinois high school sports conferences